A fast diode is a faster-than-standard current rectifier. The terms "fast" and "ultrafast" are in comparison to standard rectifiers designed for low-frequency applications such as rectifying sinusoidal current supplied from the AC mains. A “fast” rectifier typically recovers ten times faster than a standard rectifier, and an “ultrafast” designation is usually applied to rectifiers designed to beat the standard rectifier recovery by being more than fifty times faster.

Categorization as "ultrafast", "fast", or "soft" is in reference to the diode's reverse recovery characteristics. "Fast" and "ultrafast" rectifiers are so termed because they cease conducting current in the reverse direction much more quickly than standard rectifiers. "Soft" is a term applied to a subset of ultrafast rectifiers that recover to the non-conducting state quickly, but in a non-abrupt manner.

See also
 Diode
 1N400x general-purpose diodes

References

Diodes